Jhon Murillo (born 1995) is a Venezuelan football forward

Jhon Murillo may also refer to:

Jhon Murillo (triple jumper) (born 1984), Colombian triple jumper
Jhon Murillo (Colombian footballer) (born 1990), Colombian football midfielder

See also
John Murillo, American poet